Dipika Pallikal Karthik (née Pallikal; born 21 September 1991) is an Indian professional squash player. She is the first Indian to break into the top 10 in the PSA Women's rankings.

Dipika Pallikal came to prominence in 2011, when she won three WISPA tour titles. She broke into the top 10 in December 2012.

Early life
Dipika Pallikal was born in Kottayam into a Malayali Christian family. She is the daughter of Sanjiv palikel and Susan Pallikal. Her mother played international cricket for the Indian women's team.

Professional career
Deepika turned professional in 2006, but her career was filled with ups and downs initially. She became more consistent and started notching up winning performances after her brief training stint in Egypt in the beginning of 2011.

She clinched her first of three WISPA titles for 2011 in September by winning the Orange County Open in Irvine, California. She notched up her second in the United States with another WISPA tour event victory. The third came in Hong Kong in the Crocodile Challenge Cup in December 2011 and that took her to number 17 in world rankings. However it was her performance in the World Open that shot her into the limelight. She finished in the top eight. She claimed a ranking of 14 as a result of these victories in February 2012, surpassing the earlier best world ranking by an Indian – 27th by former national champion Misha Grewal in 1995.

In January 2012, she became the first Indian ever to reach the summit clash of a Silver event when she reached the final of the Tournament of Champions squash meet in New York. In August the same year, she went one step further when she reached the semi-finals of a gold event, the 2012 Australian Open, another first for an Indian.

Deepika Pallikal was an integral part of the Indian squash team that finished fifth in the 2012 Women's World Team Squash Championships. India, seeded tenth in the event, defeated higher ranked Netherlands and Ireland in the process. She defeated players like Madeline Perry in the tournament. Joshna Chinappa was another key player in the Indian line-up. 
In February 2013, she won her sixth WSA title of her career after outplaying Joey Chan of Hong Kong 11–9, 11–7, 11–4 in the final of the Meadowood Pharmacy Open in the Canadian city of Winnipeg.

In December 2012, she broke into the top 10 by achieving a career best of ranking of 10. She became the first Female Squash player to be conferred with the Arjuna Award, India's second highest sporting award in the year 2012. In February 2014 she was back at number 10 in the Women's Squash Association (WSA) rankings despite enduring a tough start to the year. At the 2014 Commonwealth Games she along with Joshna Chinappa won the squash women's doubles gold medal, making it India's first ever Commonwealth Games medal in the sport. Pallikal picked up her 10th Tour title in January 2015 after triumphing at the Winter Club Open.

At the February 2016 South Asian Games, she was part of the gold medal winning Indian Women's team  She was then defeated in the first round of the 2016 PSA Women's World Championship in April.  In May she was part of the silver medal winning Indian Women's team at the Asian Team Championship in Taipei.

Pallikal Karthik competed under her maiden name (Pallikal) until 2016, adding her married name for the 2016-17 PSA Season commencing August 2016.  Following her second Indian national Title (see below) she continued her good form winning the Australian Open, her 11th PSA title in August 2016.

Boycott of National Championship and Triumphant return
Pallikal Karthik refused to participate in the National Championship Squash between 2012 and 2015 due to the inequality in prize money where the women's championship winner was awarded only 40% of the prize money of the men's championship winner.

Equal prize money was finally agreed to for the 2016 championships where Deepika Pallikal Karthik upset Joshna Chinappa 4–11, 11–6, 11–2, 11–8, winning the title for the second time

Career statistics

Following are the highlights of Dipika's WSA tour career.

Awards

Personal life
Pallikal Karthik studied at Ethiraj College for Women majoring in English (IIIrd year-2012-2013). On 15 November 2013, she got engaged to Indian Cricketer Dinesh Karthik. whom she married in both traditional Christian wedding style and Hindu wedding style on 18 August 2015 and 20 August 2015, respectively. The couple became parents to twin boys, Kabir and Zian, on 18th October 2021.

References

External links

 
 
 profile at Squash Rackets Federation of India
 Dipika Pallikal Karthik at Times of India

1991 births
Living people
Indian female squash players
Squash players at the 2010 Commonwealth Games
Squash players at the 2014 Commonwealth Games
Squash players at the 2018 Commonwealth Games
Squash players at the 2022 Commonwealth Games
Commonwealth Games gold medallists for India
Commonwealth Games silver medallists for India
Commonwealth Games bronze medallists for India
Commonwealth Games medallists in squash
Asian Games medalists in squash
Asian Games silver medalists for India
Asian Games bronze medalists for India
Squash players at the 2010 Asian Games
Squash players at the 2014 Asian Games
Squash players at the 2018 Asian Games
Medalists at the 2010 Asian Games
Medalists at the 2014 Asian Games
Medalists at the 2018 Asian Games
South Asian Games gold medalists for India
Recipients of the Arjuna Award
Recipients of the Padma Shri in sports
Racket sportspeople from Chennai
Indian Christians
Sportswomen from Tamil Nadu
21st-century Indian women
21st-century Indian people
South Asian Games medalists in squash
20th-century Indian women
Medallists at the 2014 Commonwealth Games
Medallists at the 2022 Commonwealth Games